Frank McManus (born 16 August 1942) is an Irish nationalist activist and former Member of Parliament in the British House of Commons.

Born in Kinawley, County Fermanagh, he is a brother of Father Seán McManus, the Irish-American lobbyist and Catholic priest, and Pat McManus, a member of the Irish Republican Army killed in an explosion in 1958.

He received his secondary education at St. Michael's College, Enniskillen; he later attended Queen's University, Belfast before becoming a solicitor. In the late 1960s, he became the chair of the Fermanagh Civil Rights Association.

McManus was elected at the 1970 general election, as the Unity candidate for Fermanagh and South Tyrone. On 3 July 1970 he swore the Oath of Allegiance to Queen Elizabeth II. Following the introduction of internment, he chaired the meeting on 17 October 1971 where the Northern Resistance Movement was founded. He lost the seat at the February 1974 general election to Ulster Unionist Party (UUP) candidate Harry West, when the Social Democratic and Labour Party also stood a candidate, which resulted in a split nationalist vote. In 1977, he was a founder member of the short-lived Irish Independence Party.

He is a solicitor in Lisnaskea, and a trustee of the Fermanagh Trust.

References

Living people
1942 births
Members of the Parliament of the United Kingdom for Fermanagh and South Tyrone (since 1950)
UK MPs 1970–1974
People educated at St Michael's College, Enniskillen
Solicitors from Northern Ireland
People from Lisnaskea
Politicians from County Fermanagh